Karaçubuk is a village in the Adaklı District, Bingöl Province, Turkey. The village is populated by Kurds of the Canbegan tribe and had a population of 590 in 2021.

The hamlets of Korobaba yaylası and Yeşillik are attached to the village.

References 

Villages in Adaklı District
Kurdish settlements in Bingöl Province